Roy and Diz is an album by trumpeters Roy Eldridge and Dizzy Gillespie, recorded in 1954 and originally released on the Clef label as two separate volumes. Selections from these sessions were also released as Trumpet Battle and The Trumpet Kings.

Reception

The Billboard review of the second volume in 1955 stated: "The first Roy–Diz set, provocative as it was, struck many as more of a 'cutting contest' than a collaboration. While the competitive element is not absent in this second set, here this acts as a mutual stimulant." The AllMusic review awarded the album 3 stars.

Track listing
 "Sometimes I'm Happy" (Irving Caesar, Vincent Youmans) - 5:22
 "Algo Bueno (Woody 'n' You)" (Dizzy Gillespie) - 6:10
 "Trumpet Blues" (Roy Eldridge, Gillespie) - 7:54
 "Ballad Medley – I’m Through with Love/Can't We Be Friends/Don't You Know?/I Don’t Know Why I Love You Like I Do/If I Had You" (Fud Livingston/Paul James, Kay Swift/Bobby Worth/Fred E. Ahlert, Roy Turk/Irving King, Ted Shapiro) - 10:17
 "Blue Moon" (Lorenz Hart, Richard Rodgers) - 9:04
 "I've Found a New Baby" (Jack Palmer, Spencer Williams) - 9:14
 "Pretty Eyed Baby" (Mary Lou Williams, Snub Mosley, William Luther Johnson) - 5:31
 "I Can't Get Started" (Vernon Duke, Ira Gershwin) - 10:57
 "Limehouse Blues" (Philip Braham, Douglas Furber) - 9:54

The original LP track order was 

 Roy & Diz: Tracks 6, 8, 3, 2 & 7
 Roy & Diz #2: Tracks 1, 4, 9 & 5
 Trumpet Battle: Tracks 6, 8, 1 & 4 
 The Trumpet Kings: Tracks 3, 2, 7, 9 & 5

Personnel
 Roy Eldridge, Dizzy Gillespie - trumpet, vocals
 Oscar Peterson - piano
 Herb Ellis - guitar
 Ray Brown - bass
 Louis Bellson - drums

References 

Dizzy Gillespie albums
Roy Eldridge albums
1954 albums
Clef Records albums
Albums produced by Norman Granz